In the mathematical field of category theory, specifically the theory of 2-categories, a lax natural transformation is a kind of morphism between 2-functors.

Definition
Let C and D be 2-categories, and let  be 2-functors. A lax natural transformation  between them consists of
 a morphism  in D for every object  and 
 a 2-morphism  for every morphism  in C
satisfying some equations (see  or )

References

Category theory